is the ninth single of Hideaki Tokunaga, which was released on January 16, 1990. The song was the ending song of the first 26 episodes of the anime television Dragon Quest: Legend of the Hero Abel.

The song peaked No. 3 on Oricon's weekly singles chart, and ranked first in the annual chart of the radio show "Ten Best National Songs". The single was originally planned for release on January 15, but since that day was the Japanese holiday Coming of Age Day, the release was postponed until January 16 because of fears that primary school children who are Dragon Quest fans would overwhelm record stores.

The song was included in a 2011 charity album produced in the aftermath of the 2011 Tōhoku earthquake and tsunami.

Track listing

Cover versions
 Hiroko Moriguchi covered the song on her 2023 album Anison Covers.

References

External links
 Official website

1990 singles
1990 songs
Japanese-language songs
Dragon Quest music
Anime songs